Wilaya (also known as Tears of Sand) is a 2011 Spanish film directed by Pedro Pérez Rosado. The film is a minimalist drama about a Sahrawi refugee family suddenly confronted with the death of the mother and the return of the younger sister, who had lived most of her life in Spain, reflecting the separation of many Sahrawi families.

Plot
Fatimetu is a Sahrawi girl who returns for the burial of her mother to the Sahrawi refugee camps after 16 years living in Spain. Her older brother Jatri tells Fatimetu that, in her last will, her mother left her both the family's jaima (tent) and the responsibility of taking care of her handicapped sister Hayat. Fatimetu reluctantly accepts the responsibility. She buys an old pickup truck and finds work transporting goods between the camps (wilayas), but Fatimetu is torn between life in the desert and the memories of her Spanish foster family and friends.

Main cast
Nadhira Mohamed — Fatimetu
Memona Mohamed — Hayat
Aziza Brahim — Sdiga
Ainina Sidagmet — Said
Mohamed Mouloud — Jatri

Awards and nominations

 Abu Dhabi Film Festival New Horizons Competition Best Actress (Memona Mohamed, winner)
 Malaga Film Festival Gold Biznaga Best Film (nominee)
 Malaga Film Festival Silver Biznaga Best Original Soundtrack (Aziza Brahim, winner)
 Luxor Egyptian & European Film Festival Gold Djed Feature Film Competition (winner)
 Algiers International Film Festival Best Fiction Feature Film Competition (nominee)

Filming locations
The film was shot entirely at the Sahrawi refugee camps located in Tinduf, Algeria.

References

2011 films
Spanish drama films
2010s Spanish-language films
2010s Arabic-language films
Sahrawi films
2011 drama films
2011 multilingual films
Spanish multilingual films
2010s Spanish films